Stefano Travaglia (born 18 December 1991 in Ascoli Piceno) is an Italian tennis player.
He has a career-high ATP singles ranking of No. 60, which he reached on 8 February 2021. He also has a career-high ATP doubles ranking of No. 231 achieved on 26 July 2021.

Career

2014: ATP debut, First Challenger title 
Travaglia made his ATP main-draw debut at the 2014 Internazionali BNL d'Italia, where he qualified for the main draw by defeating Albert Montañés and Blaž Rola in the qualifying rounds. In the main draw, he put up a good fight against fellow Italian Simone Bolelli in the first round.

Travaglia won his first Challenger title in the doubles event at the 2014 Morocco Tennis Tour – Meknes, partnering Hans Podlipnik-Castillo, defeating Gerard Granollers and Jordi Samper Montaña in the final.

2020-2021: French Open third round, First ATP final and Top 60 debut career-high ranking 
Travaglia reached the  third round of a Grand Slam at the 2020 French Open for the first time in his career.

He reached his first ATP final at the Melbourne tune-up tournament 2021 Great Ocean Road Open to the Australian Open in February 2021. As a result he reached a career-high ranking of World No. 60 on 8 February 2021.

Performance timelines

Singles
Current through the 2022 Open 13.

ATP career finals

Singles: 1 (1 runner-up)

Challenger and Futures finals

Singles: 36 (24 titles, 12 runner–ups)

Doubles: 16 (10 titles, 6 runner–ups)

Top 10 wins
 He has a 1–3 (25.0%) record against players who were, at the time the match was played, ranked in the top 10.

Record against top 10 players
Travaglia's record against players who have been ranked in the top 10, with those who are active in boldface. Only ATP Tour main draw matches are considered:

References

External links
 
 

1991 births
Living people
Italian male tennis players
Competitors at the 2013 Mediterranean Games
People from Ascoli Piceno
Mediterranean Games competitors for Italy
Sportspeople from the Province of Ascoli Piceno